Rivas is a department of the Republic of Nicaragua. It covers an area of 2,162 km2 and has a population of 183,611 (2021 estimate). The department's capital is the city of Rivas.

Overview
Rivas is known for its fertile soil and beautiful beaches. Throughout the department, there are many sugar cane, plantain, tobacco, and other crop plantations. The department borders Lake Nicaragua to the east and the Pacific Ocean to the west. The southern part of the department borders with Costa Rica. A small fishermen village, called San Juan del Sur, has turned into a popular tourist attraction because of the great beaches in the area. Another major tourist attraction is Ometepe, a large volcanic island inhabited by about 32,000 people (2005 census). Some Nawat Nicarao tribals still live around small towns.

Municipalities 

 Altagracia
 Belén
 Buenos Aires
 Cárdenas
 Moyogalpa
 Potosí
 Rivas
 San Jorge
 San Juan del Sur
 Tola

References

External links 
 ViaNica.com - Rivas, including photos, hotels, restaurants and local activities

 
Departments of Nicaragua
Costa Rica–Nicaragua border crossings